The 1906 Syracuse Orangemen football team represented Syracuse University during the 1906 college football season. The head coach was Frank "Buck" O'Neill, coaching his first season with the Orangemen.

Schedule

References

Syracuse
Syracuse Orange football seasons
Syracuse Orangemen football